John Russell Deane Jr. (June 8, 1919 – July 18, 2013) was a highly decorated United States Army officer who rose to the rank of general and served as commander of the United States Army Materiel Command.

Early life
Deane was born in San Francisco, California as the son of career army officer, future Major general John R. Deane.

United States
In 1937, Deane enlisted in the 16th Infantry. After one year, he entered the United States Military Academy. Upon graduation from the academy in 1942, he joined the 104th Infantry Division as a platoon leader and, by the end of World War II, he had become a battalion commander.

Deane held the position of Intelligence Officer in Europe from 1945 to 1947 and then returned to Washington, D.C. to work in the Joint War Plans Division, HQDA. In 1951, he became Executive Assistant to the Secretary of the Army. From this post, he went to the Command and General Staff College, Fort Leavenworth, in 1952. Upon graduation, he served as Chief of Plans in the Military Armistice Commission until 1954.

Returning to the United States in late 1954, he attended the Armed Forces Staff College. Upon graduation, he became Chief of Programs and Budget in the Office of the Chief, Research and Development, HQDA. From 1958–1959, he attended the National War College. He then became Assistant to the Chief of Staff, United States Army Europe, Heidelberg, Germany. From February 1961 to June 1962, he was Commander of the 2nd Battle Group in Berlin. In December 1962, he returned to Washington as Assistant to the Director of Defense Research and Engineering, where he served as Executive Assistant to the Assistant Secretary of Defense (Deputy Director, Defense Research and Engineering). During this time, he attended Harvard Business School's six-week advanced management program. On 16 August 1965, he became the Assistant Division Commander, 82nd Airborne Division, Fort Bragg, North Carolina.

Deane received the assignment of Chief of Staff, Field Forces in Vietnam in February 1966. In July 1966, he became Assistant Division Commander, 1st Infantry Division, Vietnam. In December 1966, he was assigned as Commanding General, 173rd Airborne Brigade in Vietnam. He earned two Distinguished Service Crosses in Vietnam.

From October 1967 to September 1968, Deane served as Director of Doctrine in the Office of the Assistant Chief of Staff for Force Development, United States Army. From October 1968 to July 1970, he was the Commanding General of the 82nd Airborne Division, Fort Bragg, North Carolina. In July 1972, he was appointed the Deputy Assistant Chief of Staff for Force Development, U.S. Army, where he served until August 1972, when he became the Deputy Director of the Defense Intelligence Agency. He was promoted to full general and assumed command of the United States Army Materiel Development and Readiness Command on 12 February 1975. Deane retired from active service on 31 January 1977.

Deane died on July 18, 2013 in Bangor, Maine.

Decorations

Dates of rank

Notes

References

 
 
 

1919 births
2013 deaths
United States Army generals
United States Military Academy alumni
United States Army personnel of World War II
United States Army personnel of the Korean War
United States Army personnel of the Vietnam War
United States Army aviators
Recipients of the Distinguished Service Cross (United States)
Recipients of the Distinguished Service Medal (US Army)
Recipients of the Silver Star
Recipients of the Legion of Merit
Recipients of the Distinguished Flying Cross (United States)
5 Deane, John R.
Recipients of the Gallantry Cross (Vietnam)
People from San Francisco
United States Army Command and General Staff College alumni
Recipients of the Air Medal
National War College alumni
Military personnel from California